Notholca is a genus of rotifers known from Holocene lake deposits as well as the present day.

Species
 Notholca acuminata (Ehrenberg, 1832)
 Notholca bipalium (Müller, 1786)
 Notholca caudata Carlin, 1943
 Notholca foliacea (Ehrenberg, 1838)
 Notholca hollowdayi Dartnall, 1995
 Notholca ikaitophila Sørensen & Kristensen, 2000
 Notholca japonica (Marukawa, 1928)
 Notholca labis Gosse, 1887
 Notholca marina Focke, 1961
 Notholca psammarina Buchholz & Ruhmann, 1956
 †Notholca salina Focke, 1961
 Notholca squamula (Müller, 1786)
 Notholca striata (Müller, 1786)
 Notholca verae Kutikova, 1958
 Notholca walterkostei José de Paggi, 1982

Notholca longispina is a synonym of Kellicottia longispina (Kellicott, 1879).

References

Rotifer genera
Brachionidae